The 2016–17 NIFL Championship was the first season of the second-tier Irish League since gaining senior status. The fixtures were announced on 7 July 2016. The season began on 13 August 2016 and concluded on 29 April 2017.

On 1 April 2017, Warrenpoint Town came from 0–2 down to defeat Institute 3–2 to clinch the league title and an instant return to the NIFL Premiership for the 2017–18 season.

Teams
The 2016–17 NIFL Championship consisted of 12 teams. Ards were champions of Championship 1 in the previous season and were promoted to the 2016–17 NIFL Premiership. The next highest place team eligible for promotion, fifth-placed finishers Institute were defeated by Ballinamallard United in the Premiership play-off; therefore failing to achieve promotion.

The bottom two teams from the previous season, Lisburn Distillery and Donegal Celtic were relegated to the third-tier NIFL Premier Intermediate League; they were joined by Bangor after they failed to gain the Championship Licence, required for playing at second-tier level. They were replaced by PSNI, runners-up of the (now defunct) Championship 2 in the previous season; champions Limavady United were ineligible for promotion after failing to gain the required licence.

Stadia and locations

League table

Results

Matches 1–22
During matches 1–22 each team played every other team twice (home-and-away).

Matches 23–32
During matches 23–32 each team played every other team in their half of the table twice (home-and-away).

Top six

Bottom six

Play-offs

NIFL Premiership play-offs
The second and third-placed teams from the Championship, Institute and Ballyclare Comrades respectively, took part in the Premiership play-off semi-final. The winners will then play Carrick Rangers in the play-off final; the winners of this tie will play in the top-flight next season.

NIFL Championship play-off
The eleventh-placed team from the Championship, Armagh City, played the runners-up from the 2016–17 Premier Intermediate League, Newry City, over two legs for one spot in the 2017–18 NIFL Championship.

Newry City won 7–1 on aggregate and are promoted to the 2017–18 NIFL Championship; Armagh City are relegated to the 2017–18 NIFL Premier Intermediate League.

References

External links

NIFL Championship seasons
Northern Ireland
2016–17 in Northern Ireland association football